For a Lost Soldier is a 1992 Dutch coming-of-age romantic drama film directed by Roeland Kerbosch, based on the autobiographical novel of the same title by ballet dancer and choreographer Rudi van Dantzig. It deals with the romantic/sexual relationship between an 11-year-old boy (Van Dantzig, portrayed by Maartin Smit) and a Canadian soldier (Andrew Kelley) during the final months leading up to the liberation of the Netherlands from Nazi occupation during World War II.

Plot
In the 1980s, a middle-aged Jeroen (Jeroen Krabbé) reminisces about 1944, when his 11-year old self (Smit) and other children were sent by their parents to the countryside to escape the effects of World War II. The city suffers from food shortages, with more food available in the country. He stays with an eel fisher's family but, while there is an abundance of food, he suffers from homesickness. Jeroen and his friend Jan go to the ocean and see an American plane in the water; Jan tries to go under but claims there are too many eels and surfaces with a big cut on his thigh.

Things change when the village is liberated by Canadian troops. Jeroen meets and befriends Walt Cook (Kelley), a Canadian 20-something soldier. Walt at first treats Jeroen like a younger brother and the boy revels in the attention the soldier showers on him; eventually, their relationship becomes sexual. They also engage in friendly, platonic activities, with Jeroen driving Walt's jeep and cleaning his guns. Jeroen's foster parents are aware of the closeness between the boy and Walt, but it is left ambiguous whether they are aware of the sexual nature of the relationship.

After a few more days, Walt's unit is ordered to move and Walt leaves without saying goodbye. Jeroen hears from his foster sisters that the soldiers are leaving and rushes to their billet but finds that they have already left. (The film suggests that Walt attempts to tell Jeroen's foster father the previous evening that the troops would be leaving, but gives up when the language barrier becomes obvious.) Jeroen searches throughout town, unable to find any trace of Walt, and is further devastated when he returns home and sees that the shirt where he had stored a photo of Walt was on a clothesline in the rain, ruining the photo. Later that night, Jeroen is lying awake in his bed and notices Walt's dog tag on a scarecrow that had posed as "Walt" in a photo with his foster family, and races outside to grab the tag. However, Jeroen catches his hand on pigeon wire on the scarecrow and badly hurts it. He collapses in tears and is taken inside by his foster father. The next morning, his foster father notices the sunglasses that Walt left on the wire while his foster father is burning the dangerous scarecrow. After the war is over, Jeroen returns to his family in Amsterdam, and later decides to go to the United States.

The film ends with grown-up Jeroen affectionately recalling the story and trying to express it as a ballet dance. While rehearsing the dance, his assistant hands him an envelope. He opens the envelope to find an enlargement of the only photo of him and the foster family and also a further enlargement of the soldier's dog tag with his identification. He realizes that he can now find his lost soldier.

Cast

Reception

Stephen Holden of The New York Times praised the film's "refusal to load the story with contemporary psychological and social baggage" but wrote that the film was unable to achieve a "coherent dramatic frame". He added that the film does not insinuate Walt was responsible for harming Jeroen or had abused Jeroen, and also that within the work "is no mention of homosexuality."

Kevin Thomas of the Los Angeles Times wrote that due to a lack of clarity over the homosexual themes, it "delves into issues far too serious and controversial for such questions to go unanswered." He also stated that the confusion over language, as the film is partially in English and partially in Dutch, may have caused "lacks crucial clarity", despite good acting.

References

External links
 
 
 
 For a Lost Soldier: An Interview with the film director Roeland Kerbosch  

1992 films
1992 LGBT-related films
1990s coming-of-age drama films
1992 romantic drama films
1990s teen drama films
1990s teen romance films
1990s war drama films
Dutch coming-of-age films
1990s Dutch-language films
1990s English-language films
Dutch LGBT-related films
Dutch romantic drama films
Dutch teen films
Dutch war drama films
Films about pedophilia
Films based on biographies
Films set in 1944
Films set in the Netherlands
Gay-related films
LGBT-related coming-of-age films
LGBT-related romantic drama films
Teen LGBT-related films
Dutch World War II films
1992 multilingual films
Dutch multilingual films